Riccardo Spaltro (born 19 February 2000) is an Italian football player. He plays as a right back for  club Crotone.

Club career

SPAL
He started playing for the Under-19 squad of SPAL in the 2016–17 season. He has not been called up to the senior squad.

Loans to Serie D
In 2017–18 and 2018–19 he was loaned to Serie D clubs Clodiense and Arzignano respectively, achieving promotion to Serie C with Arzignano.

Loan to Cavese
On 9 July 2019 he signed his first professional contract with SPAL and was loaned to Serie C club Cavese for the 2019–20 season.

He made his professional Serie C debut for Cavese on 25 August 2019 in a game against Picerno. He started the game and was substituted in the 77th minute.

Return to SPAL
Upon his return from the Cavese loan, he made his Serie B debut for SPAL on 10 April 2021 against Lecce.

Renate
On 20 January 2022, he moved to Serie C club Renate.

Crotone
On 25 August 2022, Spaltro signed with Crotone who purchased his rights from SPAL (which, in turn, earlier bought him back from Renate).

References

External links
 

2000 births
Footballers from Rome
Living people
Italian footballers
Association football defenders
S.P.A.L. players
Clodiense S.S.D. players
F.C. Arzignano Valchiampo players
Cavese 1919 players
A.C. Renate players
F.C. Crotone players
Serie B players
Serie C players
Serie D players